Leonid Romanovych Korniyets (21 August 1901 – 29 May 1969) was a Ukrainian and Soviet politician, who served as the head of government of Ukrainian SSR (today's equivalent of prime-minister) from 1939 to 1944.

Biography
Leonid Korniyets was born in a town of Bobrynets that today is in Kirovohrad Oblast, central Ukraine.

References

1901 births
1969 deaths
People from Kirovohrad Oblast
People from Yelisavetgradsky Uyezd
Central Committee of the Communist Party of the Soviet Union members
Chairmen of the All-Ukrainian Central Executive Committee
Communist Party of the Soviet Union members
Head of Presidium of the Verkhovna Rada of the Ukrainian Soviet Socialist Republic
First convocation members of the Supreme Soviet of the Soviet Union
Second convocation members of the Supreme Soviet of the Soviet Union
Third convocation members of the Supreme Soviet of the Soviet Union
Fourth convocation members of the Supreme Soviet of the Soviet Union
Fifth convocation members of the Supreme Soviet of the Soviet Union
Sixth convocation members of the Supreme Soviet of the Soviet Union
Seventh convocation members of the Supreme Soviet of the Soviet Union
First deputy chairpersons of the Council of Ministers of Ukraine
First convocation members of the Verkhovna Rada of the Ukrainian Soviet Socialist Republic
Second convocation members of the Verkhovna Rada of the Ukrainian Soviet Socialist Republic
Third convocation members of the Verkhovna Rada of the Ukrainian Soviet Socialist Republic
Politburo of the Central Committee of the Communist Party of Ukraine (Soviet Union) members
Prime Ministers of Ukraine
Soviet leaders of Ukraine
Soviet partisans in Ukraine
Recipients of the Order of Bogdan Khmelnitsky (Soviet Union), 1st class
Recipients of the Order of Lenin
Recipients of the Order of the Red Banner
Recipients of the Order of the Red Banner of Labour
Ukrainian people in the Russian Empire
Burials at Novodevichy Cemetery